RD-162 is a second-generation nonsteroidal antiandrogen (NSAA) which was developed for the treatment of prostate cancer but was never marketed. It acts as a potent and selective silent antagonist of the androgen receptor (AR). The drug is a diarylthiohydantoin derivative. It is closely related to enzalutamide and apalutamide. Both RD-162 and enzalutamide show 5- to 8-fold higher affinity for the AR than the first-generation NSAA bicalutamide, and only 2- to 3-fold lower affinity than dihydrotestosterone (DHT), the major endogenous ligand of the receptor in the prostate gland.

RD-162 and enzalutamide were developed together and were derived from the nonsteroidal androgen RU-59063, which itself was derived from the first-generation NSAA nilutamide. RD-162 and enzalutamide were selected as the lead compounds from a group of over 200 compounds that were synthesized and assayed for antiandrogenic activity. Enzalutamide was ultimately selected from the two for further clinical development and was eventually marketed. RD-162 is also very closely related to apalutamide, with the two compounds differing only by the replacement of a single atom (a carbon atom in one of the phenyl rings of RD-162 swapped with a nitrogen atom in apalutamide). Apalutamide was approved for the treatment of prostate cancer in 2018.

References

Abandoned drugs
Benzamides
Fluoroarenes
Hormonal antineoplastic drugs
Ketones
Nitriles
Nonsteroidal antiandrogens
Spiro compounds
Thioureas
Trifluoromethyl compounds